Indian Institute of Information Technology, Pune (abbreviated IIITP), is one of the Indian Institutes of Information Technology, a group of institutes of Higher education in India focused on  Information Technology. It is established by the Ministry of Education (MoE), formerly the Ministry of Human Resource Development, Government of India and few industry partners as Not-for-profit Public Private Partnership (N-PPP) Institution. IIIT Pune was declared as an Institute of National Importance (INI) in August 2017.

IIITP is one of the foremost engineering universities for undergraduate and post graduate studies among the newly established institutes of information technology, and is growing up every passing year in its academics, research, student culture and placements. IIITP is located in Pune, Maharashtra, and it started its academic sessions from July 2016. It offers two courses in Bachelor of Technology (B.Tech.), Computer Science and Engineering (CSE) and Electronics and Communication Engineering (ECE). From A.Y. 2019–20, the institute has started Master of Technology (M.Tech.) and Doctor of Philosophy (Ph.D.) programmes. The institute offers M.Tech. programmes through its department of CSE with specialization in Artificial Intelligence (AI) and department of ECE with specialization in Internet of Things (IoT).
 
M.Tech. programmes are two years structured programmes with credit components from one year of course work and one year of project/ thesis. The academic programme leading to the Ph.D. degree involves a course credit requirement and a research thesis submission. The Institute encourages research in interdisciplinary areas through a system of joint supervision and interdepartmental group activities.

Establishment
To address the challenges faced by the Indian IT industry and growth of the domestic IT market, the Ministry of Education, Government of India intended to establish twenty Indian Institutes of Information Technology (IIIT), on a Not-for-profit Public Private Partnership (N-PPP) basis. The partners in setting up the IIITs are Ministry of Education, Governments of the respective States where each IIIT will be established, and the industry.

IIITP was approved by the Government of India's Ministry of Education. IIITP has been set up on a public–private partnership (PPP) basis. Fifty percent of the stakes are held by Ministry of Education, whereas thirty five percent is held by the Government of Maharashtra; the rest is held by industry partners.

Academics

IIIT Pune offers B.Tech. with an intake capacity of 175 students in CSE and 50 students in ECE (as of 2020–2021). The admission in B.Tech. programmes is through the Joint Seat Allocation Authority (JoSAA). Post graduate students are admitted through Centralized Counselling For M.Tech. (CCMT).

IIIT Pune offers CSE and ECE, which is equivalent in its standard with IITs. The course structure is flexible and allows student to study additional subjects / electives apart from prescribed curriculum. To motivate the talented students, the Institute started awarding the ‘Honors’ degree to the bright students in both the branches with ‘Major’ in various disciplines.

From academic year 2021, institute has a plan for student exchange program with International and Indian institutions of repute.

Campus

IIIT Pune is operating from the temporary campus at Ambegaon Budruk, Sinhagad Institute Road, Pune 411041. The temporary campus of IIIT Pune is at a distance of  13 km  from Pune Railway Station, 20 km from Pune Airport. It is intended that the institute will eventually move to its own permanent campus, spread over 100 acres located at Nanoli Tarf Chakan near Talegaon Dabhade. The climate for the larger part of the year is quite pleasant in Pune. The winters are favourably cool around 12 °C. In summers generally temperature varies with the threshold being 28-35 °C.

The hostel at IIITP is equipped with spacious rooms and other everyday things required by the student. IIITP provides indoor and outdoor sports facilities. The music club is equipped with Musical instruments. The canteen at IIITP serves Indian food, the students mess committee along with the faculty in-charge plans the menu for the canteen and inspect the quality and cleanliness from time to time. Alongside this, the campus has many private canteens at different locations around campus.

Placement

IIIT Pune is best known for its excellence which is considered as the 'first stop' for a large number of industries and other organizations for recruiting students. The Career Development & Corporate Relation Centre (CDCRC) provides opportunities to students through guidance, career planning, skill development. Top companies visited IIIT Pune for the batch of 2021–2022.

Student life

National / International events

 InfInITy : It is IIIT Pune's annual flagship coding contest hosted every year on Codechef. A three-hour coding with ACM style scoring. InfInITy started in 2017. The recent edition of the event (A Rated Contest) was held on 4 November 2020 and saw 2200+ international participants, 12000+ submissions. Participation from some of the most renowned Universities in the world was abundant. The event catered challenging algorithmic and logical programming problems for the users to solve in limited time of 2.5 hrs and battle for the prize pool of ₹15,000/-
 i-CONCLAVE: Annual Technical Fest of IIIT Pune (i-CONCLAVE) is celebrated at the institute. A wide range of grand technical and non-technical events are organized.

Clubs

BiT Legion: It is the elite coding club of IIIT Pune. Ever wondered how two numbers can be so powerful. That's the story with 0 and 1. Combining these two had led to the foundation of a new era of digital science. Same is the thing at BiT-Legion. The focus area of the club includes but isn't limited to competitive coding. The club doesn't have any interviews or recruitment process as such. It looks for talent in its raw form. The club goes by the motto, "There are only 10 types of people in this world. Those who know binary and those who don't !! ". BiT Legion until date remains the most active club in IIIT Pune.
Robotics: Robotics Society is one of the marquee students’ clubs of IIIT Pune. Being an Information Technology focused institution, it creates a platform for doing something out of the academic spectra, creating something mechanical and something that has a significant physical presence.
ECLECTIC: The literary club of IIIT-P is the most dynamic club of the institute. Engineering industry, over time, has evolved to make it essential to be skilled in communication and not just technical knowledge. ECLECTIC creates intellectual and communicative engineers having the ability to present a cause.
Abhinay: The Dramatics Society ignites the spark of interest of the budding technocrats in the cult of Drama, and the focus isn't just the play on-stage, it's about the message that we want the crowd to embrace. No form of Impression is more powerful than Drama.
SAAZ: The versatile music club of IIIT Pune. As they say, “that which can’t be spoken, written or communicated through facial expression is sung”. Music is communication and such a divine network of communication is one to be conserved and the music club here at IIIT Pune thrives at it.
WirkHive: Web-Development Club's aim is to propagate the enthusiasm for coding and sharp their technical thinking skills in the institute and especially amongst freshmen. IIIT Pune has nurtured “WirkHive”, a web-development club, which also gives an insight on Graphic Designing, Template Innovation, Advanced Photography and Content Creation, Copywriting and SEO to the students.

See also
Indian Institutes of Information Technology
Institutes of National Importance
Ministry of Education (India)

References

Pune
Universities and colleges in Pune
2016 establishments in Maharashtra
Educational institutions established in 2016